General Beauregard Lee is a groundhog in the US state of Georgia widely considered to be the Groundhog Day weather prognosticator for the Southern United States.

The previous forecaster before General Beauregard Lee was  General Robert E. Lee, who started making predictions in 1981. He was named after the famous American Confederate General with the same name. General Beauregard Lee's first nationally televised appearance was in 1988. General Beauregard Lee resided at Yellow River Game Ranch in Gwinnett County, Georgia for 27 years until the ranch suddenly closed in December 2017. He was then relocated to Dauset Trails Nature Center in Jackson, Georgia, to carry on his weather-predicting tradition. 

In 2011, PolitiFact decreed General Lee to be more accurate than Punxsutawney Phil, boasting a 60% national accuracy for an early spring between the years of 2001 to 2010, compared to Phil's 30%. The groundhog-sized ante-bellum style mansion that General Lee lives in is known as Weathering Heights.

Past predictions

List of individual General Lee namesakes
General Robert E. Lee (1981-1991): This General Lee was considered to have had predicted the weather correctly nine out of ten times from 1981 to 1990. General Robert E. Lee retired in 1991 after he became too old and too fat. In February 1991, a commemorative marker was put on display at Yellow River Game Ranch in celebration of his retirement.
General Beauregard Lee (1991-): He was born in 1990 and was a distant relation of the previous General Lee. His namesake is an homage to Generals P. G. T. Beauregard and Robert E. Lee. In 1991, he and General Robert E. Lee shared the role of groundhog prognosticator at Yellow River Game Ranch, and the next year Beauregard Lee had his first solo role. He was considered to have gotten the prediction for 1993 wrong due the blizzard that hit the South that year.

See also

Balzac Billy
Buckeye Chuck
Fred la marmotte
Groundhog Day
Punxsutawney Phil
Shubenacadie Sam
Staten Island Chuck
Stormy Marmot
Wiarton Willie

References

External links
Official Bio
Book entitled "Groundhog Day" by Don Yoder

Individual groundhogs
Holiday characters
Oracular animals
Individual animals in the United States
Groundhog Day